Luís Manuel Arantes Maximiano (born 5 January 1999) is a Portuguese professional footballer who plays as a goalkeeper for Serie A club Lazio.

Club career

Sporting CP
Born in Celeirós, Aveleda e Vimieiro, Braga District, Maximiano joined Sporting CP's youth system at the age of 13, from S.C. Braga. He made his senior debut in the LigaPro with the former's reserves on 25 October 2017, in a 1–1 away draw against C.D. Nacional. He also began training with the first team, acting as third choice behind Rui Patrício and Romain Salin.

Maximiano played his first competitive match with the main squad on 26 September 2019, in a 1–2 home loss to Rio Ave F.C. in the group stage of the Taça da Liga. His maiden appearance in the UEFA Europa League took place two months and two days later (same phase), as he played the entire 4–0 victory over PSV Eindhoven also at the Estádio José Alvalade. On 1 December he made his Primeira Liga bow in a 3–1 defeat at Gil Vicente FC, and eventually became first choice ahead of Brazilian Renan Ribeiro.

At the start of the 2020–21 season, Maximiano's starting role was taken by incoming Spaniard Antonio Adán.

Granada
On 15 August 2021, Maximiano signed a four-year contract with Spanish club Granada CF, for a €4.5 million fee. He made his debut in La Liga on 13 September in a 2–1 home loss to Real Betis, with his compatriot and predecessor Rui Silva in the opposite net.

Maximiano only missed three games in his only season – making a league-best 127 saves in the process – but the Andalusians returned to the Segunda División after three years.

Lazio
On 13 July 2022, Maximiano joined S.S. Lazio. He made his Serie A debut in the season opener on 14 August, being sent off in the sixth minute of the home fixture against Bologna F.C. 1909 for handling the ball just outside the penalty area as the hosts eventually won 2–1.

International career
Maximiano won his first cap for the Portuguese under-21 side on 14 November 2019, featuring 45 minutes in the 0–0 friendly draw with Slovenia.

Honours
Sporting CP
Primeira Liga: 2020–21
Taça da Liga: 2020–21
Supertaça Cândido de Oliveira: 2021

References

External links

1999 births
Living people
Sportspeople from Braga
Portuguese footballers
Association football goalkeepers
Primeira Liga players
Liga Portugal 2 players
Sporting CP B players
Sporting CP footballers
La Liga players
Granada CF footballers
Serie A players
S.S. Lazio players
Portugal youth international footballers
Portugal under-21 international footballers
Portuguese expatriate footballers
Expatriate footballers in Spain
Expatriate footballers in Italy
Portuguese expatriate sportspeople in Spain
Portuguese expatriate sportspeople in Italy